Doutreleau is a French surname. Notable people with the surname include: 

Louis Doutreleau (1909–2005), French Jesuit priest
Stephen Doutreleau (1693–after 1747), French Jesuit missionary
Victoire Doutreleau (born 1934), French fashion model

French-language surnames